Nizhniye Derevenki is a rural locality in Bolsheugonsky Selsoviet Rural Settlement, Lgovsky District, Kursk Oblast, Russia. Population:

Geography 
The village is located on the Seym River (at the confluence of the Apoka and Byk tributaries), 48 km from the Russia–Ukraine border, 62 km south-west of Kursk, 1 km north-east of the district center – the town Lgov, 10 km from the selsoviet center – Bolshiye Ugony.

 Climate
Nizhniye Derevenki has a warm-summer humid continental climate (Dfb in the Köppen climate classification).

Transport 
Nizhniye Derevenki is located 2 km from the road of regional importance  (Kursk – Lgov – Rylsk – border with Ukraine) as part of the European route E38, 0.5 km from the road  (38K-017 – Lgov), on the road of intermunicipal significance  (38K-017 – Sugrovo – railway station Lgov), 1.5 km from the nearest railway station Lgov I (Lgov-Kiyevsky) (railway lines: Lgov I — Podkosylev, 322 km – Lgov I, Lgov I – Kursk and Navlya – Lgov I).

The rural locality is situated 70 km from Kursk Vostochny Airport, 143 km from Belgorod International Airport and 273 km from Voronezh Peter the Great Airport.

References

Notes

Sources

Rural localities in Lgovsky District
Lgovsky Uyezd